Tmesisternus intricatus is a species of beetle in the family Cerambycidae. It was described by Francis Polkinghorne Pascoe in 1876. It is known from Papua New Guinea.

References

intricatus
Beetles described in 1876